Wong Chun is a Hong Kong director and screenwriter. His feature film debut Mad World (2016) was nominated for eights awards at the 36th Hong Kong Film Awards. For the film, Wong won Best New Director at the 53rd Golden Horse Awards and 36th Hong Kong Film Awards.

Early life 
Wong studied at City University of Hong Kong. He was inspired to pursue cinema after taking a class by director Patrick Tam. He graduated from the university's School of Creative Media in 2011 with a major in film.

Career 
After graduation, he entered his short film "6th March" into the 2011 Fresh Wave Short Film Competition, where he won the "Best Script" award. The film was subsequently nominated for Best Short Film award at the 49th Golden Horse Awards in 2012.

Wong and his feature film debut Mad World (2016) was one of two winners in the Higher Education Institution Group at the inaugural First Feature Film Initiative in 2013. The other winner was Steve Chan Chi-fat's Weeds on Fire (2016). Winners were given  for the budget. but weren't allowed to obtain outside funding. Wong credits CreateHK, who organized the First Feature Film Initiative, for lining up distributors for the film. Mad World, written by Florence Chan, is about a bipolar stockbroker (Shawn Yue) who is placed in the care of his father (Eric Tsang). Wong voiced the younger brother of Shawn Yue's character. The film was nominated for numerous awards, including Best New Director wins for Wong at the 53rd Golden Horse Awards and 36th Hong Kong Film Awards.

Personal life 
Wong is dating screenwriter and frequent collaborator, Florence Chan.

Filmography

Awards and nominations

See also 

 Heiward Mak—Hong Kong director and fellow City University alumni who got her start in the industry working with Eric Tsang

References

External links 
 

Hong Kong film directors
Hong Kong screenwriters
Alumni of the City University of Hong Kong
Year of birth missing (living people)
Living people